William Vernon Harcourt may refer to:

William Vernon Harcourt (scientist) (1789–1871), father of the politician, and founder of the British Association for the Advancement of Science
William Vernon Harcourt (politician) (1827–1904), son of the scientist, and Chancellor of the Exchequer